The 1986 Ballon d'Or, given to the best football player in Europe as judged by a panel of sports journalists from UEFA member countries, was awarded to Soviet forward Igor Belanov on 30 December 1986. There were 26 voters, from Austria, Belgium, Bulgaria, Czechoslovakia, Denmark, East Germany, England, Finland, France, Greece, Hungary, Italy, Luxembourg, the Netherlands, Poland, Portugal, Republic of Ireland, Romania, Scotland, Soviet Union, Spain, Sweden, Switzerland, Turkey, West Germany and Yugoslavia. Belanov became the third Soviet national who win the award after Lev Yashin (1963) and Oleh Blokhin (1975).

Rankings

Notes and references

External links
 France Football Official Ballon d'Or page

1986
1986–87 in European football